The Minister of International Development is a councillor of state and the chief of the international development portfolio of the Ministry of Foreign Affairs of Norway.  The ministry was responsible for the foreign service, the country's international interests and foreign policy. Most of the ministry's portfolio is subordinate to the Minister of Foreign Affairs. The prime operating agency for international development is the Norwegian Agency for Development Cooperation. The position has been held by ten people representing five parties.

The position was created with the appointment of Willoch's Second Cabinet on 8 June 1983, with Reidun Brusletten of the Christian Democratic Party appointed the first minister. From 1 January 1984 to 31 December 1989, the minister had their own ministry, the Ministry of Development Cooperation. Eleven people from four parties had held the position, with Hilde Frafjord Johnson of the Christian Democratic Party being the only to have held it twice. Erik Solheim of the Socialist Left Party has sat the longest, for six and a half years. Solheim also acted as Minister of the Environment from 18 October 2007 to his retirement. Heikki Holmås of the Socialist Left Party, who was appointed on 23 March 2012, became the last Minister of International Development when Stoltenberg's Second Cabinet resigned on 16 October 2013. In Solberg's Cabinet, issues related to international development were transferred to the Minister of Foreign Affairs. The position was re-established in 2018 after the Liberal Party joined the Solberg Cabinet.

Key
The following lists the minister, their party, date of assuming and leaving office, their tenure in years and days, and the cabinet they served in.

Ministers

References

International Development
 
1983 establishments in Norway
2013 disestablishments in Norway